Signal-to-noise and distortion ratio (SINADR) is a measurement of the purity of a signal. SINADR is typically used in data converter specifications. SINADR is defined as:

where  is the average power of the signal, quantization error, random noise and distortion components. SINADR is usually expressed in dB. SINADR is a standard metric for analog-to-digital converter and digital-to-analog converter.

SINADR (in dB) is related to ENOB by the following equation:

References

See also
Signal-to-noise ratio

Noise (electronics)
Digital signal processing